Anandia Evato (born 3 September 1997) is an Indonesian swimmer. She competed in the women's 50 metre breaststroke event at the 2017 World Aquatics Championships.

References

1997 births
Living people
Indonesian female swimmers
Place of birth missing (living people)
Southeast Asian Games medalists in swimming
Southeast Asian Games bronze medalists for Indonesia
Swimmers at the 2018 Asian Games
Competitors at the 2017 Southeast Asian Games
Asian Games competitors for Indonesia
Female breaststroke swimmers
21st-century Indonesian women